400 metres world record progression may refer to:

Men's 400 metres world record progression
Women's 400 metres world record progression